SS India was a steam passenger liner operated by the Peninsular and Oriental Steam Navigation Company (P&O) between 1896 and 1915.

India was the first of five sister ships built for P&O, the others being the Persia, China, Egypt and Arabia. India was the largest ship built for P&O at the time.

Built by Caird & Company of Greenock, Scotland, she was launched on 15 April 1896 and entered service later that year, operating on P&O's route between Britain, India and Australia. In 1900 she became the first ship to use P&O's new harbour facilities at Fremantle. She initially remained in service with P&O after the outbreak of the First World War, and carried Admiral Doveton Sturdee from Gibraltar back to England after the Battle of the Falkland Islands.

She was hired by the Admiralty on 13 March 1915 and was used as an armed merchant cruiser, serving in the 10th Cruiser Squadron. On 8 August that year she stopped off Helligvær, near Bodø, Norway, to investigate a suspected blockade runner, and was torpedoed by SM U-22. 
India's sinking caused the deaths of 160 of the crew. The surviving 22 officers and 119 men were taken to Narvik.

Notes

References
 
 
 
 India at clydebuilt.co.uk
 P&O heritage Ship Fact Sheet

External links
  OldWeather.org transcription of ship's logbooks April to June 1915

Ocean liners
Ships sunk by German submarines in World War I
World War I shipwrecks in the Atlantic Ocean
Shipwrecks in the Norwegian Sea
World War I passenger ships of the United Kingdom
Ships of P&O (company)
World War I Auxiliary cruisers of the Royal Navy
Maritime incidents in 1915
Ships built on the River Clyde
1896 ships